Cupitheca is a genus of Cambrian hyolith with the unusual distinction of shedding the apex of its camerate conical shell.  As with Triplicatella and Hyptiotheca, its designation to the hyolithids or orthrothecids is not straightforward, exhibiting as it does a mixture of the characters that would normally demark the two subtaxa of Hyolitha.

References

Incertae sedis
Hyolitha